World Women's Wrestling (WWW or Triple W) was a New England based women's professional wrestling promotion. New England Championship Wrestling (NECW) recognized the World Women's Wrestling Championship, and it was defended at NECW events.

Alumni

Adrianna
Alexxis Nevaeh
Alicia
Amber
Ariel
Barbie
Cha Cha
Deanna Deville
Della Morte
Elektra Arion
Ivy
Jana
Kayla Sparks
Luscious Latasha
Malia Hosaka
Melissa Coates
Mia Love
Mistress Belmont
Natalia
Nikki Roxx
Nikki Valentine
Portia Perez
Sammi Lane
Sara Del Rey
Taeler Hendrix
Tanya Lee
Tina Marina
Toxis
Violet Flame

Championship

The World Women's Wrestling Championship was a professional wrestling title contested in World Women's Wrestling and New England Championship Wrestling. It was originally known as NECW World Women's Championship until the NECW and PWF Mayhem Women's Championships were unified. Due to a split between partners, NECW and WWW temporarily closed on November 6, 2010.  In May 2011, NECW returned under the sole ownership of Sheldon Goldberg.  The WWW title continued to be the recognized women's title of the promotion.  On November 22, 2015 NECW brought World Women's Wrestling back as a stand-alone promotion presented by New England Championship Wrestling.

Names

Reigns

Combined reigns

References

External links
Official World Women's Wrestling website
NECW World Women's Championship History
World Women's Wrestling Championship History
  NECW World Women's Wrestling Championship

Independent professional wrestling promotions based in Massachusetts
Women's professional wrestling promotions